The North American Academy of Liturgy (NAAL) is an ecumenical and inter-religious association of liturgical scholars who collaborate in research. "Academy members are specialists in liturgical studies, theologians, artists, musicians, and persons in related disciplines, whose work affects liturgical expression and furthers liturgical understanding." It was founded at the University of Notre Dame in January 1975; the first official meeting was held in January 1976 at Loyola University in New Orleans, Louisiana. Its membership is heavily Roman Catholic, Episcopalian, and Lutheran.

The NAAL sponsors an annual meeting and offers periodic seminars on liturgical studies. It also publishes Proceedings of the North American Academy of Liturgy annually, with seminar reports and peer-reviewed seminar papers in the field.

Its offices are in Saint Meinrad, Indiana; the NAAL received an Internal Revenue Service nonprofit ruling in 1994.

Notable members 
Paul F. Bradshaw
Aidan Kavanagh, OP
Marion Hatchett
H. Boone Porter
Jeffery Rowthorn
Don Saliers
Frank Senn
Robert F. Taft, SJ
Louis Weil

External links 
North American Academy of Liturgy

1975 establishments in the United States
Learned societies of the United States
Professional associations based in the United States
Religious studies conferences
Theological societies